Flo Kennedy may refer to:

 Florynce Kennedy (1916–2000), American lawyer, feminist and civil rights advocate
 Flo Kennedy (bowls), Rhodesian and Zimbabwean international lawn bowler